Alexander Francis "Alec" Knight OBE was Dean of Lincoln in the last years of the 20th century and the start of the 21st.

He was born into an ecclesiastical family on 24 July 1939 and educated at Taunton School and St Catharine's College, Cambridge. Ordained in 1954, after a  spell as a curate at Hemel Hempstead he became chaplain at his old school and then director of the Bloxham Project. From here he became Director of Studies at the  Aston Training Scheme then priest in charge of Easton and Martyr Worthy and finally (before his elevation to the deanery) Archdeacon of Basingstoke and  a canon residentiary at Winchester Cathedral.

He was appointed OBE in 2006.

Notes

1939 births
People educated at Taunton School
Alumni of St Catharine's College, Cambridge
Alumni of Ripon College Cuddesdon
Archdeacons of Basingstoke
Deans of Lincoln
Officers of the Order of the British Empire
Living people